Toulouse is the prefecture of the French department of Haute-Garonne and of the larger region of Occitania. It is the fourth-largest city in France after Paris, Marseille and Lyon, with 498,003 inhabitants within its municipal boundaries (2020 census); its metropolitan area has a population of 1,470,899 inhabitants (2020 census). Toulouse is the central city of one of the 22 metropolitan councils of France. Between the 2014 and 2020 censuses, its metropolitan area was the third fastest growing among metropolitan areas larger than 500,000 inhabitants in France.

Toulouse is the centre of the European aerospace industry, with the headquarters of Airbus, the SPOT satellite system, ATR and the Aerospace Valley. It hosts the CNES's Toulouse Space Centre (CST) which is the largest national space centre in Europe, but also, on the military side, the newly created NATO space centre of excellence and the French Space Command and Space Academy. Thales Alenia Space, ATR, SAFRAN, Liebherr-Aerospace and Airbus Defence and Space also have a significant presence in Toulouse.

The air route between Toulouse–Blagnac and the Parisian airports is the busiest in France, transporting 3.2 million passengers in 2019. According to the rankings of L'Express and Challenges, Toulouse is the most dynamic French city.

Founded by the Romans, the city was the capital of the Visigothic Kingdom in the 5th century and the capital of the province of Languedoc in the Late Middle Ages and early modern period (provinces were abolished during the French Revolution), making it the unofficial capital of the cultural region of Occitania (Southern France). It is now the capital of the region of Occitania, the second largest region in Metropolitan France.

The University of Toulouse is one of the oldest in Europe (founded in 1229). Toulouse is also the home of prestigious higher education schools, notably in the field of aerospace engineering. Together with the university, they have turned Toulouse into the fourth-largest student city in France, with a university population of nearly 140,000 students.

Toulouse counts three UNESCO World Heritage Sites: the Canal du Midi (designated in 1996 and shared with other cities), and the Basilica of St. Sernin, the largest remaining Romanesque building in Europe, designated in 1998 along with the former hospital Hôtel-Dieu Saint-Jacques because of their significance to the Santiago de Compostela pilgrimage route. The city's unique architecture made of pinkish terracotta bricks has earned Toulouse the nickname  ("The Pink city").

Geography
Toulouse is in the south of France, north of the department of Haute-Garonne, on the axis of communication between the Mediterranean Sea and the Atlantic Ocean. The city is about 100 km from the Pyrenees and the borders with Andorra and Spain.

Hydrography
The city is traversed by the Canal de Brienne, the Canal du Midi and the rivers Garonne, Touch and Hers-Mort.

Climate
Toulouse has a temperate humid subtropical climate (Cfa in the Köppen climate classification). Too much precipitation during the summer months prevents the city from being classified as a Mediterranean climate zone.

History

Early history
The Garonne Valley was a central point for trade between the Pyrenees, the Mediterranean and the Atlantic since at least the Iron Age.
The historical name of the city, Tolosa (Τολῶσσα in Greek, and of its inhabitants, the Tolosates, first recorded in the 2nd century BC), is of unknown meaning or origin, possibly from Aquitanian or Iberian, but it has also been connected to the name of the Gaulish Volcae Tectosages, or to the 'same root as Irish tulach or Welsh twlch, (little hill).

Toulouse refounded by the Romans on the banks of the Garonne
Tolosa enters the historical period in the 2nd century BC, when it became a Roman military outpost. After the conquest of Gaul, it was developed as a Roman city in Gallia Narbonensis. Under the reign of Emperor Augustus and thanks to the Pax Romana, the Romans moved the city a few kilometres from the hills where it was an oppidum to the banks of the Garonne, which were more suitable for trade.

In the second half of the 1st century, the emperor Domitian distinguished Toulouse by placing it under the patronage of the goddess Pallas Athena, so that the Latin poets Martial, Ausonius and Sidonius Apollinaris called the city Palladia Tolosa (Palladian Toulouse), a term that was still used in the Renaissance and even today when the city is presented as propitious to the arts and letters.

Around the year 250, Toulouse was marked by the martyrdom of Saturnin, the first bishop of Toulouse. This episode illustrates the difficult beginnings of Christianity in Roman Gaul.

Capital of the Visigothic kingdom
In the 5th century, Toulouse fell to the Visigothic kingdom and became one of its major cities, even serving as its capital, before it fell to the Franks under Clovis in 507 (Battle of Vouillé). From that time, Toulouse was the capital of Aquitaine within the Frankish realm.

Under Frankish rule
In 721, Duke Odo of Aquitaine defeated an invading Umayyad Muslim army at the Battle of Toulouse. Many Arab chroniclers consider that Odo's victory was the real stop to Muslim expansion into Christian Europe, incursions of the following years being simple raids without real will of conquest since they did not besiege the cities (including the one that ended with Charles Martel's victory at the Battle of Tours, also called the Battle of Poitiers).

The Frankish conquest of Septimania followed in the 750s, and a quasi-independent County of Toulouse emerged within the Carolingian sub-kingdom of Aquitaine by the late 8th century. The Battle of Toulouse of 844, pitting Charles the Bald against Pepin II of Aquitaine, was key in the Carolingian Civil War.

County of Toulouse

Charlemagne had created the county of Toulouse in 778 to guard the border of Muslim Spain, but the disintegration of the kingdom of Aquitaine and the weakness of royal power in the following centuries led to the de facto independence of the county of Toulouse and many provinces.

In the 11th and 12th centuries, southern France was still steeped in Latin culture. Unlike the north of France, justice followed written Roman law and the nobles were highly educated. This was the time of the troubadours who wrote their poetry in Occitan (called "Provençal" at the time), then one of the most sophisticated languages in Europe. Like the other great lords of the Midi, the counts of Toulouse maintained and favoured these poets, this is how Count Raymond V employed for some time the famous Bernard de Ventadour, expert in singing courtly love.

In 1096, Raymond IV, Count of Toulouse, left with his army at the call of the Pope Urban II to join the First Crusade, of which he was one of the main leaders. This exodus of its warriors and nobles, reinforced by the creation of the faraway County of Tripoli by Raymond IV at the beginning of the 12th century, weakened the city militarily as well as the ascendancy that its counts had over it. The Duke William IX of Aquitaine challenged the possession of the city on the grounds that it should have been inherited by his wife Philippa (daughter of the previous count of Toulouse, whereas Raymond IV was only his brother). More than 50 years later his granddaughter Eleanor of Aquitaine still claimed the inheritance in vain.

In the 12th century the city left its Roman limits and a new district developed around the church of Saint-Sernin: the Bourg. The church of Saint-Sernin was famous and revered for its many relics, and the chapter of its canons, which had possessions as far away as Spain, was powerful enough to free itself from the control of the bishop of Toulouse. This dissent had important local political repercussions, making the Bourg in practice a separate district from the city. In 1152, the notables of Toulouse took advantage of a weakening of the county power to obtain for their city a great autonomy, they created a municipal body of consuls, called capitouls in Toulouse, to lead the city. The Bourg, which had only a quarter of the inhabitants of Toulouse, obtained as many capitouls as the rest of the city. Economically, Toulouse, which was at the center of a large cereal-growing plain, was distinguished by its numerous mills that took advantage of the force of the Garonne, among which the Bazacle Milling Company was the first recorded European joint-stock company.

The fight against Catharism and its various aspects 
At the beginning of the thirteenth century the County of Toulouse was caught up in another crusade that would last twenty years (1209-1229), of which it was the target this time. The reason for this was the development of Catharism in the south of France, which the Pope Innocent III wanted to eradicate by all possible means.

After an initial victory of the crusaders led by Simon de Montfort who defeated the combined forces of Count Raymond VI of Toulouse and King Peter II of Aragon, the following years saw the fate of the county of Toulouse swing alternately in favour of one party or the other. Finally, a late intervention by King Louis VIII of France in 1226 tipped the balance in favour of the crusaders, resulting in the submission of Count Raymond VII to the French Crown and the end of the independence of the County of Toulouse.

But beyond the military crusade, this struggle took on several important aspects for the city of Toulouse:
 The Dominican Order was founded in Toulouse by Saint Dominic in 1215. Spanish priest Dominic de Guzmán wanted to convert the Cathars to Catholicism peacefully, by preaching and by living a poor and exemplary life. After years of criss-crossing the Lauraguais countryside between Carcassonne and Toulouse, he changed his method and decided to preach in town. In 1215 he settled in Toulouse and founded a mendicant order which, within a few decades, would cover Europe with hundreds of convents: The Order of Preachers, also known as the Dominicans.
 Under the impulse of the bishop of Toulouse, Foulques, an original and austere architectural style was born in Toulouse, designed to break with the display of luxury of the Catholic church which drove the faithful towards the Cathars: the Southern French Gothic.
 In the Treaty of Paris of 1229, Toulouse formally submitted to the crown of France. The county's sole heiress Joan was engaged to Alphonse, Count of Poitiers, a younger brother of Louis IX of France. The marriage became legal in 1241, but it remained childless and so after Joan's death, the county fell to the Crown of France by inheritance.
 Another consequence of the Treaty of Paris was the creation of the University of Toulouse, established on the Parisian model, strongly sponsored by the pope and intended as a means to dissolve the heretic movement.
 Also in 1229, the Council of Toulouse was held, which laid the foundations for the long period of Inquisition that was to eradicate Catharism in the region after the military victory of the Crusade.

Kingdom of France
In 1271, Joan of Toulouse and her husband Alphonse of Poitiers died without heirs. Toulouse, which since the treaty of 1229 had been subordinate to the kingdom of France, no longer had a count and was annexed to the royal domain. The installation of numerous royal officers and the development of trade and crafts, which favoured the social ascension of merchants, renewed the city's elites. In 1298, King Philip the Fair greatly facilitated the possibility of ennobling the capitouls, whose council, renewed every year, was increasingly made up of rich merchants.

The first half of the 14th century was a prosperous period, despite the dismemberment in 1317 of the very large bishopric of Toulouse (which lost two thirds of its area and a large part of its income, a loss only partially compensated by its elevation to the rank of archbishopric), and the episode of the Shepherds' Crusade which brought a pogrom against Toulouse's Jewish population in 1320. In 1335, Toulouse had between 35,000 and 40,000 inhabitants.

In 1323 the Consistori del Gay Saber was created in Toulouse to preserve the lyric art of the troubadours by organizing a poetry contest; and Toulouse became the centre of Occitan literary culture for the following centuries. The  Consistori is considered to be the oldest literary society in Europe, at the origin of one of the most sophisticated treatise on grammar and rhetoric of the Middle Ages, and in 1694 it was transformed into the Royal Academy of the Floral Games (Académie des Jeux Floraux), still active today, by king Louis XIV.

The 14th century also saw a significant increase in the influence of the University of Toulouse, particularly following the move of the papacy from Rome to Avignon. Many law graduates from the University of Toulouse had brilliant careers in the Avignon curia, several became cardinals and three became popes: John XXII, Innocent VI and Urban V. These powerful prelates financed the establishment of colleges in the university towns of southern France, not only Toulouse but also Montpellier, Cahors and Avignon.

The Black Death in 1348, then the Hundred Years' War caused a major crisis that lasted until the following century. Despite strong immigration, the population lost more than 10,000 inhabitants in 70 years. By 1405 Toulouse had only 19,000 people. In these hardships, the city was the key stronghold of the French defence in the south of France during the worst years of the Hundred Years' War, when the English troops from Aquitaine had taken Montauban and only Toulouse remained as an obstacle to their conquest of southern France. This military threat to the city and especially to the surrounding countryside was not conducive to its development, despite the strengthening of ties with the royalty that it entailed.

In 1369 pope Urban V attributed to the Dominican church of the Jacobins of Toulouse the bones of the Dominican theologian Saint Thomas Aquinas, perhaps to honor the city that had been the cradle of the Dominican order at the beginning of the previous century.

The political and economic situation improved by the middle of the 15th century. In 1443 King Charles VII established the second parliament of France after that of Paris. Reinforcing its place as an administrative and judicial center, the city grew richer, participating in the trade of Bordeaux wine with England, as well as cereals and textiles. A major source of income was the production and export of pastel, a blue dye made from woad .

Toulouse suffered several fires, but it was in 1463 that the Great Fire of Toulouse broke out, ravaging the city for fifteen days. After this dramatic event, King Louis XIII exempted the city from taxes for 100 years. The capitouls issued municipal decrees favouring the use of brick in buildings, rather than excessively flammable wood or cob.

In the 16th century, and until 1562, the economy of Toulouse experienced a golden age: its Parliament made it the judicial capital of a large part of southern France, and the city became the first European centre for the trade in woad, the only blue dye then known in Europe which was very much in demand in the textile industry at the time. Its humanist milieu developed thanks to its university and parliament, which trained and attracted intellectual elites. The wealth generated by this culturally and economically dynamic environment is the source of the superb Renaissance mansions in Toulouse. In 1550 the population of the city made it the second or third largest city in France. It was estimated to have 50,000 inhabitants, a figure it would not regain until the 18th century.

In 1562 the French Wars of Religion began and Toulouse became an ultra-Catholic stronghold in a predominantly Protestant region, the era of economic prosperity came to an end. The governor of Languedoc, Henri II de Montmorency, who had rebelled, was executed in 1632 in the Capitole in the presence of King Louis XIII and Cardinal Richelieu.

In 1666 Pierre-Paul Riquet started the construction of the Canal du Midi which links Toulouse to the Mediterranean Sea, and is considered one of the greatest construction works of the 17th century. Completed in 1681, the canal stimulated the economy of Toulouse by promoting the export of cereals and the import of olive oil, wine and other goods from the Mediterranean regions.

In the 18th century, Toulouse was a provincial capital that prided itself on its royal academies (the only city in France, along with Paris, to have three royal academies), but sometimes seemed far removed from the debates of ideas that agitated the Enlightenment. A famous example illustrates this backwardness of Toulouse mentalities of the time: in 1762 its powerful parliament sentenced Jean Calas to death. The philosopher Voltaire then accused the Parliament of Toulouse of religious intolerance (Calas was a Protestant), gave the affair a European repercussion and succeeded in having the judgment of the parliament quashed by the King's Council, which did much damage to the reputation of the parliament. It was on this occasion that Voltaire published one of his major philosophical works: his famous Treatise on Tolerance.

With the French Revolution of 1789 and the reform or suppression of all royal institutions, Toulouse lost much of its power and influence: until then the capital of the vast province of Languedoc, with a parliament ruling over an even larger territory, the city then found itself simply at the head of the single small department of Haute-Garonne.

19th century
On 10 April 1814, four days after Napoleon's surrender of the French Empire to the nations of the Sixth Coalition (a fact that the two armies involved were not yet aware of), the Battle of Toulouse pitted the Hispanic-British troops of Field Marshal Wellington against the French troops of Napoleonic Marshal Soult, who, although they managed to resist, were forced to withdraw. Toulouse was thus the scene of the last Franco-British battle on French territory.

Unlike most large French cities, there was no real industrial revolution in 19th century Toulouse. The most important industries were the gunpowder factory, to meet military needs, and the tobacco factory. In 1856 the railway arrived in Toulouse and the city was modernised: the ramparts were replaced by large boulevards, and major avenues such as the rue d'Alsace-Lorraine and the rue de Metz opened up the historic centre.

In 1875 a flood of the Garonne devastated more than 1,000 houses and killed 200 people. It also destroyed all the bridges in Toulouse, except the Pont-Neuf.

20th and 21st centuries

World War I brought to Toulouse (geographically sheltered from enemy attacks) chemical industries as well as aviation workshops (Latécoère, Dewoitine), which launched the city's aeronautical construction tradition and gave birth after the war to the famous Aéropostale, a pioneering airmail company based in Toulouse and whose epics were popularised by the novels of writers such as Joseph Kessel and Antoine de Saint-Exupéry (himself an Aéropostale pilot).

In the 1920s and 1930s the rise of the Toulouse population was increased by the arrival of Italians and Spaniards fleeing the fascist regimes of their country. Then, in the early 1960s, French repatriates from Algeria swelled the city's population.

In 1963, Toulouse was chosen to become one of the country's eight "balancing Metropolis", regaining a position among the country's major cities that it had always had, but lost in the 19th century. The French state then encouraged the city's specialisation in aeronautics and space activities, sectors that had experienced strong growth in recent decades, fueling economic and population growth.

On 21 September 2001, an explosion occurred at the AZF fertiliser factory, causing 31 deaths, about 30 seriously wounded and 2,500 light casualties.

In 2016 a territorial reform made Toulouse the regional prefecture of Occitanie, the second largest region in metropolitan France, giving it a role commensurate with its past as a provincial capital among the most important in France.

Population

The population of the city proper (French: commune) was 498,003 at the January 2020 census, with 1,470,899 inhabitants in the metropolitan area, up from 1,268,438 at the January 2009 census. Thus, the metropolitan area registered a population growth rate of +1.36% per year between 2009 and 2020, the third-highest growth rate of any French metropolitan area larger than 500,000 inhabitants in France, after Montpellier and Bordeaux, although it was slightly lower than the growth rate registered between the 1990 and 2009 censuses. Toulouse is the fourth most populated city in France, after Paris, Marseille and Lyon, and the fifth most populated metropolitan area after Paris, Lyon, Marseille, and Lille.

Fueled by booming aerospace and high-tech industries, the Toulouse metropolitan area's population grew by 57.3% between the 1990 and 2020 censuses (within its 2020 borders), which means +1.52% per year on average during those 30 years, compared with a growth of 15.3% for metropolitan France between 1990 and 2020, i.e. +0.48% per year. This was the second-highest population growth of any French metropolitan area larger than 500,000 inhabitants (only the Montpellier metropolitan area grew more than Toulouse between 1990 and 2019).

The Toulouse metropolitan area reached 1,470,899 inhabitants in January 2020, and stood as the 5th most populated metropolitan area in France, behind the metropolitan areas of Paris, Lyon, Marseille, and Lille, but ahead of the metropolitan area of Bordeaux, which the Toulouse metropolitan area passed in population in the 1990s.

A local Jewish group estimates there are about 2,500 Jewish families in Toulouse. A Muslim association has estimated there are some 35,000 Muslims in town.

Government and politics

Toulouse Métropole

The Community of Agglomeration of Greater Toulouse (Communauté d'agglomération du Grand Toulouse) was created in 2001 to better coordinate transport, infrastructure and economic policies between the city of Toulouse and its immediate independent suburbs. It succeeds a previous district which had been created in 1992 with fewer powers than the current council. As of February 2004 estimate, the total population of the Community of Agglomeration of Greater Toulouse was 651,209 inhabitants, 65.5% of whom live in the city of Toulouse. Due to local political feuds, the Community of Agglomeration only hosts 61% of the population of the metropolitan area, the other independent suburbs having refused to join in. Since 2009, the Community of agglomeration has become an urban community (in French: communauté urbaine). This has become a métropole in 2015, spanning 37 communes.

Local politics

One of the major political figures in Toulouse was Dominique Baudis, the mayor of Toulouse between 1983 and 2001, member of the centrist UDF. First known as a journalist known for his coverage of the war in Lebanon, 36-year-old Dominique Baudis succeeded his father Pierre Baudis in 1983 as mayor of Toulouse. (Pierre Baudis was mayor from 1971 to 1983.)

Baudis tried to strengthen the international role of Toulouse (such as its Airbus operations), as well as revive the cultural heritage of the city. The Occitan cross, flag of Languedoc and symbol of the counts of Toulouse, was chosen as the new flag of the city, instead of the traditional coat of arms of Toulouse (which included the fleur de lis of the French monarchy). Many cultural institutions were created, in order to attract foreign expatriates and emphasise the city's past. For example, monuments dating from the time of the counts of Toulouse were restored, the city's symphonic concert hall (Halle aux Grains) was refurbished, a city theater was built, a Museum of Modern Art was founded, the Bemberg Foundation (European paintings and bronzes from the Renaissance to the 20th century) was established, a huge pop music concert venue (Zénith, the largest in France outside Paris) was built, the space museum and educational park Cité de l'Espace was founded, etc.

To deal with growth, major housing and transportation projects were launched. Line A of the underground was opened in 1993, and line B opened in 2007. The creation of a system of underground car parking structures in Toulouse city centre was sharply criticised by the Green Party.

In 2000, Dominique Baudis was at the zenith of his popularity, with approval rates of 85%.  He announced that he would not run for a fourth (6-year) term in 2001. He explained that with 3 terms he was already the longest-serving mayor of Toulouse since the French Revolution; he felt that change would be good for the city, and that the number of terms should be limited. He endorsed Philippe Douste-Blazy, then UDF mayor of Lourdes as his successor. Baudis has since been appointed president of the CSA (Conseil supérieur de l'audiovisuel) in Paris, the French equivalent of the American FCC.

Philippe Douste-Blazy narrowly won in the 2001 elections, which saw the left making its best showing in decades. Douste-Blazy had to deal with a reinvigorated political opposition, as well as with the dramatic explosion of the AZF plant in late 2001.

In March 2004, he entered the national government, and left Toulouse in the hands of his second-in-command Jean-Luc Moudenc, elected mayor by the municipal council. In March 2008, Moudenc was defeated by the Socialist Party's candidate Pierre Cohen.

At the next elections in 2014 Moudenc defeated Cohen in a rematch to re-take the job with more than 52% of the votes, and he was re-elected with almost the same score in 2020.

Mayors

Sights and architecture

Classified "City of Art and History", Toulouse has a very rich architectural heritage ranging from large Romanesque and Gothic churches to neo-classical facades such as that of the Capitole, to the prestigious mansions of the Renaissance. This ancient heritage is mainly enclosed within the 220 hectares of the city's inner boulevard (one of the largest protected urban areas in France).

Almost all the buildings of the historical centre were made with the traditional building material of the region: the "foraine" brick that has earned the city the nickname of Ville rose (Pink city). Medieval heir to the Roman brick, the "foraine" brick is characterised by its large dimensions, its flat appearance and its colour ranging from orange/pink to red.

White stone is also present in smaller quantities. As there were no stone quarries near Toulouse, it was transported from the Pyrenees via the Garonne river and was for a long time rare and therefore expensive, considered in Toulouse as a luxury material. However, it is enough to give Toulouse's architecture one of its characteristics: red/white polychromy.

Romanesque architecture (11th-12th c.)

The Romanesque architecture of Toulouse is largely dominated by the presence of the Basilica of Saint-Sernin, one of the most important churches of its time in Europe, and fortunate enough to keep its Romanesque character virtually intact.

Basilica of Saint-Sernin
Basilica of Saint-Sernin, part of the Way of Saint James UNESCO World Heritage Site, was also in itself a major place of pilgrimage. It is one of the two largest surviving Romanesque churches in Europe. With more than two hundred relics (including that of Saint Saturnin who gave his name to the church), many of which were donated by Charlemagne to the shrine that preceded the present church, Saint-Sernin is the church with the most relics after Saint Peter of Rome.

Conceived from the outset as a gigantic reliquary, the church was mainly built at the end of the 11th century and at the beginning of the 12th century to welcome the crowds of pilgrims, its double-sided aisles and the ambulatory surrounding the apse make it the archetype of the great pilgrimage church, where pilgrims could make the circuit around the church and were able to stop for meditation and prayer at the apsidal chapels of the transept and the radiating chapels of the choir. The church is also particularly noteworthy for the quality of its Romanesque sculptures, including numerous capitals and the historiated tympanum of the Miègeville gate, one of the first of its kind.

Gothic architecture (13th c.-early 16th c.)

Southern French Gothic: a militant religious architecture

At the beginning of the 13th century, the Catholic clergy of the South of France, seeing a growing number of the faithful turning to the Catharism which advocated a more pious austerity, showed the will to correct the defects of the Catholic Church which indulged in luxury. Under the impulse of the bishop of Toulouse, Foulques, an austere and militant architectural style was born with the reconstruction of the Cathedral of Toulouse: the Southern French Gothic. Conceived according to an ideal of poverty and humility to bring the faithful together in a single, vast nave to facilitate preaching, this architectural style then developed during the 13th century in the grand mendicant convents of the city, before spreading in the 14th century to a large number of churches and cathedrals in the region.

Several churches or convents in Toulouse belong to this architectural trend, but two of them are particularly symbolic and remarkable:

 Cathedral of Saint-Étienne (Saint Stephen) is the seat of the Roman Catholic Archdiocese of Toulouse. Its construction, which was mainly done at the beginning and then at the end of the 13th century, reflects the history of this decisive century which saw the city lose its independence to become a French city. The single nave is the first example of Southern French Gothic, at 19 metres wide it probably was at its completion the widest in Western Europe (1210-1220). The higher choir that adjoins it was built in the Gothic style of northern France shortly after the city became part of the Crown of France in 1271.
 Convent of the Jacobins (13th century / early 14th century) was the Dominican convent of Toulouse and is considered to be, together with the Albi Cathedral, the pinnacle of Southern French Gothic architecture. Like all Southern French Gothic churches it has a deliberately austere exterior, but on the inside its alignment of cylindrical columns form one of the tallest colonnades ever erected in Gothic architecture (28 metres high). The masterpiece of this church is the column that closes the choir (1275-1292), its palm tree shape was a hundred years ahead of the flamboyant gothic fan vaults. Because he thought that the bones of Saint Thomas Aquinas deserved «the most beautiful and most splendid surroundings», in 1368 Pope Urban V made the church of the Jacobins the burial place of the famous Dominican friar, one of the most notable philosophers and theologians of the Middle Ages.

Gothic civil architecture
Toulouse has preserved about thirty Gothic stair towers (plus a dozen Renaissance or later towers), the remains of private mansions (called hôtels particuliers) from the Middle Ages and the early 16th century. Often hidden in courtyards, some of these towers are high enough to exceed their function of serving the floors and display the ambition of their owners.

At a time when most of the houses in Toulouse were built in wood or cob, the brick construction of these towers and hôtels also testifies to their quality.

Renaissance architecture (16th c.-early 17th c.)

In the 16th century, Toulouse experienced a golden age coinciding with the Renaissance in France. The woad trade (pastel) brought merchants of international stature to the city, and the Parliament of Toulouse made the city the judicial capital of a large part of the south of France. These wealthy elites had private mansions built, remarkable for their architecture inspired by architectural treatises such as those of Serlio, Alberti or Vitruvius, but also by the royal castles of the Loire Valley and the Île-de-France.

Renowned for the quality of their architecture, the private mansions of the Toulouse Renaissance that have survived to the present day were built over more than a century (around 1515–1620) by reputed architects such as Louis Privat, Nicolas Bachelier, Dominique Bachelier or Pierre Souffron. The most famous of these hôtels are those of Assézat, Bernuy, Vieux-Raisin or Clary...

17th century architecture

17th century religious architecture
The French Wars of Religion, which started in the second half of the 16th century, brought to the city many religious orders who came to seek asylum in this solid Catholic bastion. They had beautiful baroque churches built in the 17th century: among them, the Order of Carthusians, expelled by the Protestants from the region of Castres, founded the church of Saint-Pierre des Chartreux, the order of the Discalced Carmelites built the church of Saint-Exupère, the blue penitents founded the church of Saint-Jérôme and the order of Carmelite nuns created a convent of which a remarkable painted chapel remains.

17th century civil architecture
After the Renaissance, the decorations in civil architecture became less numerous and ostentatious, due to the importance given to the moderation of the architectural structures and the development of interior decorations. The play of colours (between brick and stone) and reliefs (bossing) were less costly and nevertheless effective solutions for livening up facades. The 17th century is the century that gave Toulouse the largest number of its private mansions, most of them built by members of parliament.

18th century architecture
In the 18th century Toulouse made its living from its Parliament and from the wheat and corn trade, which was boosted by the creation of the Canal du Midi at the end of the previous century. Among the major architectural achievements, the most notable were undoubtedly the construction of the quays of the Garonne and the new facade of the Capitole (1750-1760), designed by architect Guillaume Cammas.

In the last third of the 18th century, the ever increasing influence of the Parisian model meant that red brick was no longer popular: the city facades were then whitewashed to imitate stone. This is why nowadays, even though the white paint has generally been removed, there are walls with deep grooves carved in brick to imitate ashlar architecture.

19th century architecture
Toulouse's 19th century architecture can be divided into three periods, which sometimes overlapped. In the first half of the century, at the instigation of architect Jacques-Pascal Virebent, the main planned squares were created: the Place du Capitole and the Place Wilson (called place Villeneuve when it was built), whose uniform architecture was inspired by Rue de Rivoli in Paris.

From 1830 onwards, Auguste Virebent and his brothers (sons of Jacques-Pascal) developed a factory of low-cost moulded decorations which met with great success and adorned Toulouse facades with numerous terracotta ornaments, far from the austere architecture of their father.

Then, in the last third of the 19th century, large Haussmann-style avenues were opened in the town centre, such as the central Alsace-Lorraine street, built in yellow brick to imitate Parisian stone.

20th and 21th centuries architecture
From the middle of the 19th century, the arrival of the railway in Toulouse facilitated the supply of stone and made it cheaper for construction, and architects did not hesitate to play on the old traditional Toulouse codes linked to the prestige of stone construction, even if these no longer had the economic justification of yesteryear. Thus, at the beginning of the 20th century, the main railway station was built entirely in white stone.

Subsequently, concrete replaced the traditional materials, but brick and stone were still used for cladding, as shown recently by the work of prestigious architects such as Robert Venturi and Denise Scott Brown for the seat of the departmental council, or Shelley McNamara and Yvonne Farrell for the Toulouse School of Economics building.

Banks of the Garonne, Canal du Midi, parks 
The banks of the Garonne river offer an interesting urban panorama of the city. Red brick dykes from the 18th century enclose the river which was subject to destructive floods. The Pont-Neuf took almost a century to build as the project was so ambitious (1545-1632). It was a very modern bridge for its time, removing the housing on the deck and using techniques such as basket-handle (surbased) arches, openings in the piers and stacked spouts to spread the water, making it the only bridge in Toulouse to withstand the violent floods of the past. Further downstream, the Bazacle is a ford across the Garonne river, in the 12th century the Bazacle Milling Company was the first recorded European joint-stock company. On the left bank of the river, historically a flood-prone bank, stand two former hospitals whose origins date back to the 12th century: the Hôtel-Dieu Saint-Jacques and the Hôpital de La Grave. Isolated on the left bank, victims of the plague and other sick people were thus kept away from the city by the width of the river.

Built at the end of the 17th century, the Canal du Midi bypasses the city centre and has linked Toulouse to the Mediterranean Sea ever since. Its 240 kilometres were inscribed as a UNESCO World Heritage Site in 1996.

The Jardin des Plantes, the Grand Rond and the Jardin Royal form a set of adjacent parks that span several blocks and include the Museum of Natural History, cafés, children's activities and a botanical garden (18th-19th century). The Prairie des Filtres, the Raymond VI garden and the Japanese garden are other interesting parks that border the center of Toulouse.

Museums and theme parks 
Toulouse has many museums, the most important of which are:
 Musée des Augustins is the fine arts museum of Toulouse, it is located in the former Augustinian convent.
 Bemberg Foundation, housed in the Hôtel d'Assézat, presents to the public one of the major private collections of art in Europe.
 Musée Saint-Raymond is the archeological museum of Toulouse, located in a former college of the university it presents the ancient history of Toulouse and a very rich collection of Roman sculptures from the imperial Roman villa of Chiragan.
 Musée Paul Dupuy is the museum of Decorative Arts and Graphic Arts, including a very rich collection of clocks and watches.
 Musée Georges Labit is dedicated to artifacts from the Far-Eastern and Ancient Egyptian civilizations.
 Muséum de Toulouse is one of the most important natural history museums in France, housed in the former convent of the Discalced Carmelites.
 Les Abattoirs is the museum of modern and contemporary art of the city, opened in a former municipal slaughterhouse.

Toulouse also has several theme parks, notably highlighting its aeronautical and space heritage:
 Cité de l'espace is a scientific discovery centre focused on spaceflight.
 Aeroscopia is an aeronautical theme park located near Toulouse–Blagnac Airport, dedicated to the preservation of aeronautical historical heritage (it hosts for example two Concorde airliners).
 L'Envol des pionniers is a museum that traces the great adventure of l'Aéropostale, a pioneering airmail company based in Toulouse which operated between France and South America from 1918 to 1933, and employed legendary pilots such as Antoine de Saint-Exupéry, Jean Mermoz or Henri Guillaumet...
 Halle de La Machine is a vast hall that houses numerous small or giant animated machines, often inspired by the world of aeronautics, human or technological epics.

Economy

Since 2003, Toulouse has been the French city with the fastest growing GDP per capita, a performance driven by growing high-tech industries.

Toulouse economy can rely on three pillars: large industrial companies, research laboratories and a huge pool of students, engineers and scientists. Indeed, Toulouse is home to the second largest research and education centre in France, it has a high quality of education, first class engineering schools, powerful industries supported by world leaders, such as Airbus or Thales Alenia for aeronautics and space. This ecosystem fosters innovation in fields such as artificial intelligence, IOT, robotics, avionics, embedded systems, biotechnology, health etc.

Toulouse can particularly be described as the 'capital' of the European aerospace industry: it hosts the Airbus headquarters and assembly-lines of Airbus A320, A330, and A350. The A380 was also produced here (the last completed in 2021), as was the Concorde supersonic aircraft. Toulouse also hosts the headquarters of ATR, one of the two headquarters of Liebherr Aerospace and Groupe Latécoère. As for the space industry, with 12,000 jobs, 400 companies and 25% of the European workforce, Toulouse is the main European hub.

Education

Toulouse has the fourth-largest student population in France after Paris, Lyon and Lille with 103,000 students (2012).

Colleges and universities

The University of Toulouse (Université de Toulouse) was established in 1229 (now split into three separate universities). Like the universities in Oxford and Paris, the University of Toulouse was established at a time when Europeans were starting to translate the writings of Arabs of Andalus and Greek philosophers. These writings challenged European ideology—inspiring scientific discoveries and advances in the arts—as society began seeing itself in a new way. These colleges were supported by the Church, in hopes of reconciling Greek philosophy and Christian theology.
 Catholic University of Toulouse
 Université Toulouse I, Toulouse School of Economics, Toulouse School of Management and Institut d'études politiques de Toulouse
 University of Toulouse-Jean Jaurès (Formerly University of Toulouse II – Le Mirail)
 Université Paul Sabatier (Toulouse III)

Toulouse is also the home of Toulouse Business School (TBS), Toulouse School of Economics (TSE), the Institut supérieur européen de gestion group (ISEG Group), the Institut supérieur européen de formation par l'action (ISEFAC), E-Artsup and several engineering schools:
 ICAM Toulouse (Institut catholique d'arts et métiers)
 INSA Toulouse
 ISAE SUPAERO (Institut supérieur de l'aéronautique et de l'espace)
 ENAC (École Nationale de l'Aviation Civile)
 INP ENSEEIHT (École Nationale Supérieure d'Électronique, d'Électrotechnique, d'Informatique, d'Hydraulique et des Télécommunications)
 ENSFEA (École nationale supérieure de formation de l'enseignement agricole)
 INP ENSIACET (École nationale supérieure d'ingénieurs en art chimique et technologique)
 INP ENSAT (École Nationale Supérieure Agronomique de Toulouse)
 INP ENM (École Nationale de la Météorologie)
 EPITA (École pour l'informatique et les techniques avancées)
 EPITECH (École pour l'informatique et les nouvelles technologies or European Institute of Information Technology)
 IPSA (Institut Polytechnique des Sciences Avancées)
 EIPurpan (École d'ingénieurs de Purpan)

Primary and secondary schools
The most well known high schools in Toulouse are Lycée Pierre-de-Fermat and Lycée Saint-Sernin.

International schools serving area expatriates are in nearby Colomiers:
 International School of Toulouse
 Deutsche Schule Toulouse (German school)

Transport

Train 
The main railway station, with regional and national services, is Toulouse-Matabiau station. In addition, there are several smaller stations in the city: Toulouse-Saint-Agne, Gallieni-Cancéropôle, Toulouse-Saint-Cyprien-Arènes, Le TOEC, Lardenne, Saint-Martin-du-Touch, Les Ramassiers, Montaudran and Lacourtensourt.

Metro 
In addition to an extensive bus system, the Toulouse Metro is a VAL (Véhicule Automatique Léger) metro system made up of driverless (automatic) rubber-tired trains. Line B, which opened in June 2007, serves 20 stations north to south and intersects line A at Jean Jaurès.

Line C has existed since line A was completed. It is not VAL but an urban railway line operated by SNCF. It connects to line A at Arènes. Two other stations located in Toulouse are also served by line C. Lardenne, formerly named "Gare des Capelles", changed its name in September 2003 when line C opened. Le TOEC station opened on 1 September 2003 with the creation of line C, allowing an urban train service in Toulouse and close western suburbs.

Similarly, Line D runs south from Toulouse Matabiau to Muret.

Tramway 
The tramway line T1 (operating since December 2010), runs from Beauzelle to Toulouse passing through Blagnac. All urban bus, metro and tram services are operated by Tisséo. Tramway line T2 is a branch of the first line serving notably Toulouse Blagnac airport.

Cable car 
Since May 13, 2022, the city of Toulouse has had a new mode of public transportation called Téléo. This is a cable car that links Paul-Sabatier University to Rangueil Hospital and the Oncopole (a major cancer research center). It allows to fly over the Garonne and the hills of Pech David and, with its 3 kilometers, it is the longest urban cable car in France. It is presented as the first link in a public transport belt that is not radial and oriented towards the city center, but designed to encircle the south of Toulouse.

Bicycle 
In 2007, a citywide bicycle rental scheme called VélôToulouse was introduced, with bicycles available from automated stations for a daily, weekly, monthly or yearly subscription.

Airports 
Airports include:
 Toulouse Blagnac: the principal local airport
 Toulouse Francazal: former principal airport, then former military airfield, its activity is nowadays reduced
 Toulouse Lasbordes: this airfield is dedicated to leisure aviation and flying clubs

Canal 
The Canal du Midi begins in Toulouse and runs up to Sète.

Toulouse public transportation statistics
The average amount of time people spend commuting with public transit in Toulouse, for example to and from work, on a weekday is 44 min. 9.1% of public transit riders, ride for more than 2 hours every day. The average amount of time people wait at a stop or station for public transit is 9 min, while 10.4% of riders wait for over 20 minutes on average every day. The average distance people usually ride in a single trip with public transit is 7 km, while 8% travel for over 12 km in a single direction.

Communications
Toulouse is the home of Bonhoure Radio Tower, a 61-metre high lattice tower used for FM and TV transmission. In 2001 a large (100 km) optical fiber (symmetric 360Gbit/s) network named
Infrastructure Métropolitaine de Télécommunications was deployed around the city and suburbs.

Culture

The Théâtre du Capitole is the home of opera and ballet; there has been a theatre on the site since 1736. The Orchestre National du Capitole, long associated with Michel Plasson, plays at the Halle aux Grains.

Le Château d'Eau, an old 19th-century water-tower, was converted as a gallery in 1974 by Jean Dieuzaide, a French photographer from Toulouse and is now one of the oldest public places dedicated to photography in the world. Toulouse's art museums include the Musée des Augustins, the Musée des Abattoirs, the Musée Georges Labit, and the Fondation Bemberg in the Hôtel d'Assézat. The Musée Saint-Raymond is devoted to Antiquity and the Muséum de Toulouse to natural history.

Toulouse is the seat of the Académie des Jeux Floraux, the equivalent of the French Academy for the Occitan-speaking regions of southern France, making Toulouse the unofficial capital of Occitan culture. The traditional Cross of Toulouse (from Provence, under the name of cross of Provence), emblem of the County of Toulouse and commonly widespread around all of Occitania during the Middle Ages is the symbol of the city and of the newly founded Midi-Pyrénées région, as well as a popular Occitan symbol.

The city's gastronomic specialties include the Saucisse de Toulouse, a type of sausage, cassoulet Toulousain, a bean and pork stew, and garbure, a cabbage soup with poultry. Also, foie gras, the liver of an overfed duck or goose, is a delicacy commonly made in the Midi-Pyrénées.

Sport
Stade Toulousain of the Top 14 is the most successful rugby union club in all of Europe, having been crowned European champions five times and French champions twenty-one times.

Toulouse Olympique represents the city in rugby league. The club has been playing in the British rugby league system since 2016. They have been playing in the  top tier in 2022 and will play in the 2nd tier Championship in 2023. The club has had historical success in France, having been crowned French champions six times.

The city also has a professional football team, Toulouse FC, which plays in Ligue 1, the highest level of football in France, and won the 1957 Coupe de France Final. The club plays at the Stadium Municipal, which was a venue during the 1998 FIFA World Cup and 2007 Rugby World Cup, as well as hosting important club rugby games and several Rugby League World Cups. Toulouse was also a host of EuroBasket 1999.

Notable people

Several notable Toulousains have been scientists, such as Jean Dausset (1916-2009), 1980 winner of the Nobel Prize in Physiology or Medicine; 17th-century mathematician Pierre de Fermat (1607-1665), who spent his life in Toulouse, where he wrote Fermat's Last Theorem and was a lawyer in the city's Parlement; Paul Sabatier (1854-1941), 1912 winner of the Nobel Prize in Chemistry; Albert Fert (b. 1938), 2007 winner of the Nobel Prize in Physics who grew up in Toulouse where he attended the Lycée Pierre-de-Fermat and Jean Tirole (b. 1953), owner of the 2014 Nobel Prize in Economic Sciences, chairman and founder of the Toulouse School of Economics along with Jean-Jacques Laffont.

Musically, Toulouse is one of the two controversial, disputed birthplaces of Carlos Gardel (1890-1935) (the other being Tacuarembo, Uruguay), probably the most prominent figure in the history of the tango. The city's most renowned songwriter is Claude Nougaro (1929-2004). The composer and organist Georges Guiraud (1868–1928) was born in Toulouse.

Concerning arts, Toulouse is the birthplace of Impressionist painter Henri Martin (1860-1943) as well as sculptors Alexandre Falguière (1831-1900) and Antonin Mercié (1845-1916). Moreover, Jean-Auguste-Dominique Ingres (1780-1867) and Antoine Bourdelle (1861-1929) were trained at the Toulouse fine arts school. Post Impressionist painter Henri de Toulouse-Lautrec's (1864-1901) father was Count Alphonse Charles de Toulouse-Lautrec Monfa (1838-1913) and was part of an aristocratic family of Counts of Toulouse, Odet de Foix, Vimcomte de Lautrec and the Viscounts of Montfa. French graffiti artist Cyril Kongo was born in Toulouse in 1969.

Raymond IV, Count of Toulouse (c. 1041 - 1105), one of the leaders of the First Crusade, was born in Toulouse. Aviation pioneer Clément Ader (1841-1925) and psychiatrist Jean-Étienne Dominique Esquirol (1772-1840) were also natives. French football legend Just Fontaine (1933-2023), record holder for the most goals in a single FIFA World Cup (thirteen in six games in 1958), lived in Toulouse for the last 60 years of his life.

International relations

Twin towns and sister cities
Toulouse is twinned with:

 Atlanta, United States, since 1975
 Bologna, Italy, since 1981
 Elche, Spain, since 1981
 Chongqing, China, since 1981
 Kyiv, Ukraine, since 1975
 Tel Aviv, Israel, since 1962

Other cooperations
Toulouse also has accords of cooperation with the following towns:

 Zaragoza, Aragón, Spain
 N'Djamena, Chad
 Hanoi, Vietnam
 Saint-Louis, Senegal
 Düsseldorf, Germany

See also

 138 Tolosa, an asteroid
 Roman Catholic Archdiocese of Toulouse
 André Abbal
 Listing of the works of Alexandre Falguière
 The works of Antonin Mercié
 List of the mayors of Toulouse

Notes

References

Citations

Sources

External links

 Toulouse tourist office
 ToulouseCity.com  
 Toulouse city guide – About-France.com
 Toulouse: pink, violets, red and black – Official French website
 Official site 

 
Cities in France
Communes of Haute-Garonne
Languedoc
Cities in Occitania (administrative region)
Midi-Pyrénées
Prefectures in France
Populated places established in the 2nd century BC